International House or International Student(s) House may refer to:

Australia
International House, Sydney, a heritage-listed building in Sydney, New South Wales
International House (University of Melbourne), a residential college on the campus of Melbourne University
 International House, University of New South Wales, a residential college on the campus of University of New South Wales
 International House, University of Queensland, a residential college on the campus of the University of Queensland
 International House, The University of Sydney, a residential college on the campus of the University of Sydney
 International House, University of Wollongong, a residential college of the University of Wollongong

United Kingdom 

International Students House, London, a residence for British and overseas students in London

United States

 International House of Atlanta, at the Georgia Institute of Technology in Georgia
 International House of Harrisburg, an independent residential facility near Harrisburg University in Pennsylvania
 International House (Globe, Arizona), listed on the NRHP in Arizona
 International House Berkeley, at the University of California, Berkeley, in California
 International House Hotel in New Orleans, Louisiana
 International House of Chicago, at the University of Chicago, in Illinois
 International House of New York, an independent residential facility and programs center near Columbia University, in New York
 International Student House of Washington, D.C., an independent residential facility in the District of Columbia

Other uses
 International House (1933 film), a 1933 film
 International House of Pancakes (IHOP), a restaurant chain
 International House World Organisation (IHWO), a worldwide organization of language schools